Dagger Peak is a rock peak rising steeply from sea level to about  at the west end of Comb Ridge, located near the extremity of The Naze on James Ross Island, close south of Trinity Peninsula. This area was first explored in 1902 by the Swedish Antarctic Expedition under Otto Nordenskiöld. The peak was charted and given this descriptive name by the Falkland Islands Dependencies Survey in 1945.

References
 

Mountains of Graham Land
Landforms of James Ross Island